Krishnan Nair Shantakumari Chithra (born 27 July 1963), always credited as K. S. Chithra or Chithra, is an Indian playback singer and Carnatic musician. In a career spanning over four decades, she has recorded over 25,000 songs in various Indian languages,  as well as foreign languages such as Malay, Latin, Arabic, Sinhalese, English and French. She is also known for her extensive history of collaboration with music composers like A. R. Rahman, Ilaiyaraja, Hamsalekha, M. M. Keeravani and with the playback singers K. J. Yesudas and S. P. Balasubrahmanyam over the years. She is regarded as a cultural icon of South Indian states.

Chithra is a recipient of six National Film Awards, nine Filmfare Awards South and 36 different state film awards from six states of India such as 16 Kerala State Film Awards, 11 Andhra Pradesh State Film Awards, 4 Tamil Nadu State Film Awards, 3 Karnataka State Film Awards, 1 Orissa State Film Awards, 1 West Bengal State Film Awards. She was awarded India's third-highest civilian honours Padma Bhushan in 2021 and Padma Shri in 2005 for her valuable contributions towards the Indian musical fraternity. She is the first Indian woman to be honoured by British Parliament at House of Commons, United Kingdom.
She was honoured with the Rashtrapati Award for “First Ladies” in the field of music felicitated by the Ministry of Women and Child Development at the Rashtrapati Bhavan on 20 January 2018.

Early life

Chithra received her training in Carnatic music from K. Omanakutty, passed B.A. in music with first class and third rank from the University of Kerala, and completed a master's degree in music. She was selected to the National Talent Search Scholarship from the Central Government from 1978 to 1984.

Playback singing

Malayalam cinema 
K. S. Chithra was introduced to Malayalam playback by M. G. Radhakrishnan in 1979 who recorded her voice for films and private albums. Attahasam, Snehapoorvam Meera and Njan Ekananu were the first few films in which she recorded her voice. She also performed live concerts with K. J. Yesudas in India and abroad. The song "Manjal Prasadavum" from the film Nakhakshathangal (1986) composed by Bombay Ravi got her the second National Film Award for Best Female Playback Singer. For the same composer, she sang the song "Indupushpam Choodi Nilkum" for the film Vaishali (1989) and won her third National Film Award. Her first Kerala State Film Award for Best Singer was for the song "Aayiram Kannumayi" from the film Nokkethadhoorathu Kannum Nattu (1986) composed by Jerry Amaldev. Since then, she has earned wide recognition by singing popular songs under the compositions of Raveendran, Shyam, S. P. Venkitesh, Mohan Sithara,Salil Chowdary,Kannur Rajan, Ilaiyaraaja, Johnson, Ouseppachan, M. K. Arjunan, A. T. Ummer, Berny Ignatius, M. B. Sreenivasan, Mohan Sithara, Vidyasagar, Ramesh Narayan, Sharreth, M. Jayachandran and Deepak dev. She is regarded as "Nightingale of Kerala (Vanambadi)" and recorded many successful songs in Malayalam. She recorded a number of songs for the composer S. P. Venkitesh and her maximum duet songs in Malayalam are with K. J. Yesudas and M. G. Sreekumar. As of 2017, she has won the Kerala State Awards for the record 16 times. Her latest song "Theerame" from the movie Malik 2021 became another awesome hit in Malayalam Music Industry .

Telugu cinema 
Chithra's first Telugu song was "Paadalenu Pallavaina" from the dubbed version of Tamil film Sindhu Bhairavi (1985) composed by Ilaiyaraaja. Her first song in a Telugu film is "Abba Daanisoku" from Aakhari Poratam (1988), sung alongside S. P. Balasubrahmanyam. She gained recognition for "Jallanta Kavvinta" from Geethanjali (1989) and then went onto sing several songs. Chithra received her first Nandi Award, presented by Government of Andhra Pradesh for "Kalika Chilakala Koliki" from Seetharamayya Gari Manavaralu (1991). She won a total of 11 Nandi Awards as Best Female Playback Singer for various Telugu songs.

Hindi cinema 

Chithra was introduced to Hindi film music in 1985; she recorded her first Hindi song composed by S. P. Venkitesh, which was not commercially released. For the 1991 Hindi film Love, composers Anand–Milind, called upon her to sing duets song along with S. P. Balasubrahmanyam and since then, Chithra has recorded for around 200 Bollywood songs.

Apart from film songs, Chithra recorded for many private albums of which Piya Basanti and Sunset Point  became hugely popular and went on to win several laurels including the MTV Music Video Awards. The popularity of the former album made her known among the Northern part of Indians identify her as "Piya Basanti" Chitra.

Other Indian languages

Performances

Work and association with music directors

Chithra has sung over 25,000 songs.

Concerts

Apart from playback singing, she also appeared among the panel of judges in the singing reality television shows at Kerala (Idea Star Singer and Josco Indian Voice), at Tamil Nadu (Airtel Super Singer Junior), where she also won the award for Best Female Judge and at Andhra Pradesh (MAA TV) Super Singer. Apart from this judgement panel she has appeared in music-shows like Swarabhishekam, Super Masti, Jhumandi Nadam. She is a regular singer in Ilayaraja's, A.R. Rahman's and S.P. Balasubrahmanyam's concerts. She has performed all over the world in SPB's concerts along with S. P. Sailaja, S. P. Charan. She has been a regular singer participating in all the concerts of SPB50-The World Tour, she has performed almost all around the world with S. P. B. Charan, S. P. Sailaja, Sunitha Upadrashta Karthik & Shweta Mohan.

She had performed at the Royal Albert Hall and House of Commons in London. On 6 June 2009, she performed in Qinghai International Musical Journey on Water and Life concert with a rendition of "Tunga Tarange Gange" alongside other singers from nations located around various major rivers such as the Ganges, Volga, Rhine, Danube, Mississippi, and Amazon.

Studio albums
Chithra recorded her first studio album with Voodoo Rapper for the album called Ragga Raaga in 1993. She recorded the albums in Hindi, Piya Basanti (2000) and Sunset Point. She associated with Ustad Sultan Khan for Piya Basanti which was certified Gold. Sunset Point had eight songs written and narrated by Gulzar and sung by Chithra and Bhupinder. In 2006, she released an album in dedication to M. S. Subbulakshmi named My Tribute. It is a collection of Kritis and bhajans dedicated to Subbulakshmi. In 2009 she released Nightingale: A Salute to Lataji, a musical tribute to Lata Mangeshkar on her 80th birthday. She also recorded many Malayalam albums for K. J. Yesudas, M. Jayachandran and Sharreth compositions. She also planned a ghazal album with Ghulam Ali and Asha Bhosle.

International projects
 Recorded with the Arab singer Jawad Ali for his album Amar Ul Hob
 Recorded a song for the jazz pianist Herbie Hancock

Public profile

Philanthropy
Chithra, along with a Kerala-based satellite channel, Asianet Cable Vision (ACV), jointly launched a fundraising organisation, Sneha Nandana, to raise funds for the welfare of retired musicians who have lost their careers due to changes in the music industry. She launched this organisation on the occasion of her completion of three decades in the music playback industry. She said that the fund would provide help to the musicians with financial impediments and those suffering from health problems. A cultural event called Chithra Pournami was held on 15 February 2011 at Thiruvananthapuram to celebrate the 30th year of her career and also to launch this organisation.

Awards, honors, and recognition

Chithra is a recipient of six National Film Awards, nine Filmfare Awards South and 36 different state film awards. She has won film awards from all the four south Indian states. She was awarded India's third highest civilian honor Padma Bhushan in 2021 and Padma Shri in 2005 for her valuable contributions towards the Indian musical fraternity. In 2019, she was honoured by Sultan bin Muhammad Al-Qasimi, sovereign ruler of the Emirate of Sharjah and a member of the Federal Supreme Council of the United Arab Emirates, for successfully completing 40 years in Indian film industry.  She was honoured with the Rashtrapati Award  by the Ministry of Women and Child Development of the Government of India at the Rashtrapati Bhavan on 20 January 2018.

She received the MTV Video Music Award – International Viewer's Choice at the Metropolitan Opera House, New York in 2001. She received honorary doctorates from Sathyabama University in 2011 and from The International Tamil University, United States in 2018. She is the only South Indian female singer who has presented her maiden concert at the world's prestigious concert hall Royal Albert Hall in London in 2001. Her song "Kannalane/Kehna Hi Kya" from the film Bombay (1995) was included in The Guardian "1000 Songs Everyone Must Hear Before You Die" list.

Personal life

Chithra is married to Vijayashankar, an engineer and businessman. They had a daughter Nandana, who was born with Down's syndrome. Her daughter drowned in a pool in Dubai in 2011 when Chithra was about to perform at an A. R. Rahman concert.

References

External links

 

1963 births
Living people
Assamese playback singers
Singers from Kerala
Bollywood playback singers
20th-century Indian singers
Indian women playback singers
Indian women classical singers
Kannada playback singers
Kerala State Film Award winners
Tamil playback singers
Malayalam playback singers
Singers from Thiruvananthapuram
Recipients of the Padma Shri in arts
Telugu playback singers
Tamil Nadu State Film Awards winners
Filmfare Awards South winners
Nandi Award winners
Recipients of the Kalaimamani Award
Women Carnatic singers
Carnatic singers
Film musicians from Kerala
21st-century Indian singers
20th-century Indian women singers
21st-century Indian women singers
Women musicians from Kerala
Best Female Playback Singer National Film Award winners
Recipients of the Padma Bhushan in arts
Sanskrit-language singers
Screen Awards winners
South Indian International Movie Awards winners